The second season of RuPaul's Drag Race Down Under premiered on 30 July 2022 and concluded on 17 September 2022. The cast was announced via TVNZ's Instagram account and a live interview with Kween Kong on TVNZ's Breakfast show on 7 July 2022.

Following the death of Queen Elizabeth II on 8 September 2022, BBC Three delayed the final two episodes in the United Kingdom until after the period of national mourning. The winner of the second season of RuPaul's Drag Race Down Under was Spankie Jackzon, with Hannah Conda and Kween Kong as runners-up.

Background
The second season was confirmed and casting was opened on 9 September 2021. Casting closed on 5 October. The season filmed in January and February 2022. Season 1 judges Michelle Visage and Rhys Nicholson were spotted in south Auckland, leading to speculation that both would be returning to judge season 2.

Spankie Jackzon previously appeared on season 2 of House of Drag, a series hosted and judged by Drag Race Down Under Season 1 contestants Anita Wigl'it and Kita Mean, winning the season over runner-up Elektra Shock.

Contestants

Ages, names, and cities stated are at time of filming.

Contestant progress

Lip syncs
Legend:

Guest judges
Listed in chronological order:

Lucy Lawless, New Zealand actress in theatre, television and film
Urzila Carlson, South African–New Zealand comedian and actress

Special guests
Guests who appeared in episodes, but did not judge on the main stage.

Episode 1: 
Bindi Irwin, Australian television personality, conservationist, zookeeper and actress
Robert Irwin, Australian television personality, conservationist, zookeeper and actor

Episode 3: 
Chris Parker, New Zealand actor, comedian, LGBTQI+ advocate and reality personality

Episode 4:
Raven, runner-up of both RuPaul's Drag Race Season 2 and All Stars Season 1

Episode 5:
Sophie Monk, Australian singer, actress, model and television personality

Episode 6:
Samantha Harris, Australian model
Suzanne Paul, New Zealand infomercial hostess and television host

Episode 7:
Murray Bartlett, Australian actor
Norvina, president of Anastasia Beverly Hills

Episode 8:
Delta Goodrem, Australian singer and actress
Elektra Shock, dancer, choreographer and judge on Dancing with the Stars: New Zealand Season 9, a contestant on RuPaul's Drag Race Down Under Season 1 and runner-up on House of Drag Season 2
Kita Mean, winner of RuPaul's Drag Race Down Under Season 1 and co-host and judge of House of Drag

Episodes

References

External links

  (Australia)
  (New Zealand)

2022 in LGBT history
2022 New Zealand television seasons
2022 Australian television seasons
RuPaul's Drag Race Down Under seasons